WNJO (90.3 FM) is a radio station licensed to Toms River, New Jersey, with its transmitter located on the Barnegat Peninsula south of Seaside Park. The station is owned by New York Public Radio, and is an affiliate of their New Jersey Public Radio network.

WNJO's signal is extremely limited in Ocean County due to co-channel interference from WNJZ which transmits a 6,000 watt signal from Cape May Court House, just 25 miles from the Ocean County border.

WNYC assumed control of the stations that make up NJPR under a management agreement on July 1, 2011.  Previously, WNJO had been part of New Jersey Network's radio service.

WNJO was knocked off-the-air along with the rest of the NJPR network when its transmitter took a heavy hit from Hurricane Sandy. While WNJO's sister stations all came back online on November 3, it took until December 14 to get WNJO back on the air because the Barnegat Peninsula was inaccessible from mainland New Jersey for some time after the storm. New York Public Radio engineering director Jim Stagnitto initially thought the transmitter had been carried into Barnegat Bay, but he and his team found the transmitter intact when they were finally able to inspect the site. However, WNJO's coverage area didn't lose access to NPR programming.  It is one of the few portions of the NJPR service area that gets a clear signal from the WNYC stations, and WNJZ—a satellite of Philadelphia's WHYY-FM—also covers the area with a decent signal.

References

External links
 

NJO
Radio stations established in 2008
NPR member stations
New York Public Radio